Byrna Barclay (born October 8, 1940) is a writer and editor in Saskatchewan, Canada.

Biography
She was born and raised in Saskatoon. Since 1962, she has lived in Regina. Barclay served as president of the Saskatchewan Writers Guild and also was editor of Freelance, the Guild's newsletter, and fiction editor of Grain, its literary journal. She was founding editor of Transition, a magazine for the Saskatchewan branch of the Canadian Mental Health Association. She was also vice-chair of the Saskatchewan Arts Board.

In 2004, Barclay was named to the Saskatchewan Order of Merit.

She married Ronald Barclay and they have two children.

Bibliography
Her works include:
 Summer of the Hungry Pup (1982), which received the Saskatchewan Culture and Youth First Novel Award
 The Last Echo (1983)
 Winter of the White Wolf (1985)
 From the Belly of a Flying Whale (1988)
 Crosswinds (1996), which won the Best Fiction category of the Saskatchewan Book Awards
 Searching for the Nude in the Landscape (1997)
 Girl at the Window (2004), which won the Readers' Choice Award of the Saskatchewan Book Awards
 The Forest Horses (2010)

References 

1940 births
Living people
Canadian women novelists
Members of the Saskatchewan Order of Merit
Writers from Regina, Saskatchewan
Writers from Saskatoon